The Freedom Rock (also known as the Patriotic Rock) is a  boulder located along Iowa Highway 25 near Menlo in western Iowa approximately  south of exit 86 (Iowa 25 – Guthrie Center, Greenfield) on Interstate 80.

The rock is located on private property and was used for graffiti. Since 1999, however, it is repainted every year in time for Memorial Day with the purpose of thanking U.S. veterans and their families for their military service and sacrifice.  The rock is painted by Ray "Bubba" Sorensen II from Greenfield.  Sorensen is not commissioned or paid to paint The Freedom Rock, he uses his own money along with donations and sales of Freedom Rock merchandise to fund the project. After watching Saving Private Ryan as a 19 year old at Iowa State University in 1999, Bubba was moved and painted the first Freedom Rock before Memorial Day with the words "THANK YOU VETERANS FOR OUR FREEDOM" over a painting of the six Marines raising the United States flag atop Mount Suribachi on Iwo Jima.

In the Spring of 2013, Sorensen began The Iowa Freedom Rock Tour by painting a Freedom Rock (patriotic themed rock) in every county in Iowa at a cost of  US$5,000 plus lodging & supplies per rock, creating a unique statewide veterans memorial for the state.  The rocks placed in each county will not be repainted every year.  He expected to take ten years to complete the painting of a freedom rock in each of Iowa's 99 counties, but in a 2016 update interview during only his fourth year of his Iowa tour, he expects to complete the Iowa tour in seven or eight years and has only ten more counties in Iowa to book.  As he completes the last four years of his Iowa tour, he will begin a nationwide 50 state tour. He plans to paint some freedom rocks of the 50 state tour in warmer places than Iowa during December, January, and February, starting with Alabama in the winter of 2016–7. On October 27, 2016, the Greene County's Freedom Rock which is located in front of the grain elevator in Jefferson became the 55th rock he has painted in Iowa. On November 11, 2018, a Freedom Rock was unveiled at the Iowa Veterans Cemetery near Van Meter, Iowa. In 2021 on the 20th anniversary of 9/11 attacks in 2001, he painted portraits on the first Freedom Rock, which is located near Menlo, honoring Oscar Austin, Pat Tillman, and others. On September 18, 2021, he completed The Iowa Freedom Rock Tour with the unveiling of his 99th Freedom Rock in Iowa which is located at the Central City Fairgrounds in Linn County, Iowa. His 100th Freedom Rock will be auctioned off with community bids accepted until November 1 and the announcement of the community purchasing the 100th Freedom Rock will be on November 11, Veterans Day, 2021.

As of June 1, 2021, he has painted Freedom Rocks in Minnesota, Wisconsin, Missouri, and Washington. As of September 27, 2021, he had painted additional Freedom Rocks in both Nebraska and North Dakota for a total of six states with Freedom Rocks.

References

External links
The Freedom Rock by Ray "Bubba" Sorensen II
Snopes article
The Freedom Rock Tour by Ray "Bubba" Sorensen II
Map of Iowa Freedom Rock Tour showing locations of Freedom Rocks in Iowa

Landmarks in Iowa
Buildings and structures in Adair County, Iowa